"She's So California" is a song co-written and recorded by American country music artist Gary Allan.  It was released in October 2008 as the third and final single from his 2007 album Living Hard.  The song reached number 24 on the U.S. Billboard Hot Country Songs chart.  The song was written by Allan, Jaime Hanna and Jon Randall.

Content
The song is an up-tempo in which the narrator uses various California-themed imagery to describe his lover, whom he says is "so California".

Critical reception
Blake Boldt of Country Universe gave it a B-rating saying it was "little more than album filler", calling the production both "modest and "a bit sterile", but saying that Allan's "gravelly" vocal was of note. Allen Jacobs of Roughstock gave the song a favorable review, writing that "the big chorus with fiddle-play is the best part of the song" and "the storyline is as vast and dynamic as the state that inspired it."

Chart performance

References

2008 singles
Gary Allan songs
2007 songs
Songs written by Gary Allan
Songs written by Jon Randall
Song recordings produced by Mark Wright (record producer)
MCA Nashville Records singles
MCA Records singles